The New Zealand cricket team toured Australia from early December 1913 to late January 1914, playing four first-class matches against state teams and five other matches.

The team
Three of New Zealand’s leading batsmen, David Collins, Harold Lusk and Arthur Sims, were unavailable. The provincial cricket associations were asked to submit the names of suitable players from their regions. Out of 40 players nominated, 14 were eventually chosen.

 Dan Reese (captain)
 Joe Bennett
 Charles Boxshall
 Tom Carlton
 Lancelot Hemus
 Rupert Hickmott
 Billy Patrick
 Charles Robinson
 Don Sandman
 Nessie Snedden
 Robert Somervell
 Leslie Taylor
 Henry Tattersall
 Bertie Tuckwell

Tour matches
The New Zealanders won the first first-class match against Queensland, lost to New South Wales and Victoria, and drew with South Australia.

First match

Second match

Third match

Fourth match

Fifth match

Sixth match

Seventh match

Eighth match

Ninth match

References

External links
 New Zealand in Australia 1913-14 at CricketArchive

Other sources
 Don Neely & Richard Payne, Men in White: The History of New Zealand International Cricket, 1894–1985, Moa, Auckland, 1986, pp. 53–56.
 Dan Reese, Was It All Cricket?, George Allen & Unwin, London, 1948, pp. 389–401.

1913 in New Zealand cricket
1913 in Australian cricket
1914 in New Zealand cricket
1914 in Australian cricket
New Zealand cricket tours of Australia
Australian cricket seasons from 1890–91 to 1917–18
International cricket competitions from 1888–89 to 1918